Chernomorets is a seaside town in Bulgaria.

Chernomorets may also refer to:

Sports teams
 FC Chernomorets Novorossiysk, a Russian football club
 FC Chornomorets Odessa, a Ukrainian football club
 PSFC Chernomorets Burgas, a Bulgarian football club
 FC Chernomorets Burgas, a Bulgarian football club
 PFC Chernomorets Balchik, a Bulgarian football club
 FC Chernomorets Byala, a Bulgarian football club
 PFC Chernomorets Burgas Sofia, a Bulgarian football club
 BC Chernomorets, a Bulgarian basketball club

Sports venues
 Chernomorets Stadium, a multi-purpose stadium in Burgas, Bulgaria
 Chernomorets Arena, a planned future modern sports venue in Burgas, Bulgaria
 Chernomorets Stadium, Byala, a multi-use stadium in Byala, Varna Province, Bulgaria

See also
 Chornomorets (disambiguation)